Daria Lukianenko (born 18 May 2002) is a Russian Paralympic swimmer. At the 2019 World Para Swimming Championships, she won a silver medal in the 100m breaststroke SB12 event and a bronze medal in the 200m individual medley SM13 event. She competed at the 2020 Summer Paralympics and won a silver medal in the 100m breaststroke SB12 event.

References 

2002 births
Living people
People from Shakhty
Sportspeople from Rostov Oblast
Russian female freestyle swimmers
Paralympic swimmers of Russia
Medalists at the World Para Swimming Championships
Swimmers at the 2020 Summer Paralympics
Medalists at the 2020 Summer Paralympics
Paralympic medalists in swimming
Paralympic silver medalists for the Russian Paralympic Committee athletes
Russian female medley swimmers
Russian female breaststroke swimmers
S12-classified Paralympic swimmers
21st-century Russian women